Honest is the first EP by We Are Messengers. Word Records in conjunction with Curb Records released the EP on March 29, 2019. It was produced by Tedd Tjornhom and Benjamin Backus.

Singles 
The first single, "Maybe It's Ok", was released prior to the EP's release on November 9, 2018. The song peaked at #2 on the Billboard Christian Airplay Charts. The second single, The Devil Is A Liar, was released on January 25, 2019.

Track listing

Charts

Awards 
On June 2, 2019, "Maybe It's Ok" won the K-Love Fan Award for Breakout Single.

References 

2019 EPs